Akash Sunethkumara (Akash Sk) is a Sri Lankan filmmaker, writer and actor. He is known for the short films that he created with his production team called the High School Junkies.

Early life 
Akash Sunethkumara was born in Colombo, Sri Lanka. He is an alumnus of St. Nicholas' International College Negombo and Staffordshire University.

Career 
In 2016, Sunethkumara created his first publicly released short film EIDETIC which was his Masters thesis project. A low-budgeted short of $300, EIDETIC screened at various film festivals including San Diego Comic-Con's Independent Film Festival.  

In 2018, he directed a short horror titled The Summoning. 

In 2019, he released a mini-follow up to The Summoning titled The Friend which was also published on Crypt TV.

In 2020, Sunethkumara directed The Knight Out, a project marketed as an "action musical" which merged the concepts of a music video with martial arts action. 

In 2022, Sunethkumara helmed Temporal, a time-travel sci-fi short film about a physicist who races against time to prevent the death of his girlfriend. The film required eight months of work to complete and was experimental to determine how well they could "localize a western sci-fi concept". It was the first project that Sunethkumara and the team had done in collaboration with an external party and also the first project where they collaborated with veteran Sri Lankan actor Lakshman Mendis. Sumner Forbes of Film Threat stated "I was mightily impressed by the production value that Sunethkumara brings to bear in this 30-minute film. The director never loses sight of the film’s strengths, which are the entertaining temporal contradictions that come from leaping back into the recent past, recalling Shane Carruth’s Primer."

Additionally, Sunethkumara started a webinar series during the COVID-19 pandemic called Junkyard Theory where he hosts filmmakers from Hollywood on a livestream. The first education platform of its kind in Sri Lanka, it also offers short modular film courses. Sunethkumara has hosted prominent names in the industry such as Paul Hirsch, Donald Sylvester, Richard Norton, Fabian Wagner and Simon Barry.

Filmography

References

External links 
Official website

1994 births
Living people
Sri Lankan film directors